West Norwood may refer to:

West Norwood, London, England
West Norwood railway station, in West Norwood, London
West Norwood, New Jersey, United States